Spider Hill is an annual haunted event held at Three Sisters Park in Chillicothe, Illinois to celebrate Halloween. The attractions include a trail, haunted house, and a haunted hayride.  It is touted by the organizers as the number one haunted attraction in Central Illinois.

History
Spider Hill was launched in 1999 by the local Optimist Club and Three Sisters Park and featured three main attractions: The Massacre Mansion, The Haunted Express haunted hayride and The Trail of Terror, which walks visitors through the forest. Sponsors of the event remind visitors of the legend of Spider Hill and the event's namesake where 23 individuals died at the site during World War I from venomous spider bites. The event is run entirely by volunteers, starting with 60 in 2000 and increasing to 165 in 2007. Volunteers participate in organized workshops to share scaring techniques. The last attendance figures released were in 2004, when 20,000 visitors went through the various attractions during the October weekends and Halloween night. Event volunteers or actors reveal the biggest screams result from encounters with terrifying clowns, causing a grown man to faint twice in 2003 and another to spit at the circus specter for scaring his girlfriend.

Spider Hill went on hiatus in 2020.

Attractions
Massacre Mansion is the haunted house, which encompasses about 8000 square feet.  The Trail of Terror is a winding path through the forest featuring scares along the way.  The original haunted hayride has been replaced with Zombie Invasion, which is a paintball shooting experience from aboard a "war wagon". In 2012, the operators of Spider Hill bought a haunted house from Cedar Rapids called Nightmare Manor.  Its props and scenery were used to double the size of Massacre Mansion.

References

Other bibliography 

   Access World News. Newsbank. Accessed via Illinois Community College Library system, Illinois Central College: http://infoweb.newsbank.com.library.icc.edu/
   Access World News. Newsbank. Accessed via Illinois Community College Library system, Illinois Central College: http://infoweb.newsbank.com.library.icc.edu/
   Access World News. Newsbank. Accessed via Illinois Community College Library system, Illinois Central College: http://infoweb.newsbank.com.library.icc.edu/
   Access World News. Newsbank. Accessed via Illinois Community College Library system, Illinois Central College: http://infoweb.newsbank.com.library.icc.edu/
   Access World News. Newsbank. Accessed via Illinois Community College Library system, Illinois Central College: http://infoweb.newsbank.com.library.icc.edu/

External links
 Spider Hill official website

1999 establishments in Illinois
Chillicothe, Illinois
Festivals in Illinois
Halloween events in the United States
Recurring events established in 1999
Spiders in popular culture
Tourist attractions in Peoria County, Illinois